The Blue Sky Marathon is a series of trail races held outside of Fort Collins, Colorado. The current lineup of races includes a half-marathon, a marathon, and a 50K.

All races start in Horsetooth Mountain Open Space in Larimer County; the majority of the race is on singletrack trails, although individual sections range from gravel paths to technical rocky terrain.

Past winners

Marathon

Male: 	Johannes Rudolph 	3:23:46.3 	2008
Female: Lindsey Habermann 	4:30:09.2 	2008

Half marathon

Male: 	Jonathan Vigh 	1:31:30.2 	2008
Female: Susan Nuzum 	1:43:19.3 	2008

References

External links
Official website
Blue Sky Marathon at marathonguide.com

Marathons in the United States
Ultramarathons in the United States
Trail running competitions